This is a list of rivers in Botswana. This list is arranged by drainage basin, with respective tributaries indented under each larger stream's name.

Atlantic Ocean
Orange River
Molopo River
Nossob River
Moselebe River

Indian Ocean
Zambezi River
Cuando River (Chobe River) (Linyanti River)
Makwegana River (Selinda Spillway) (receives outflow from the Okavango during floods)
Limpopo River
Shashe River
Ramokgwebana River
Tati River
Motloutse River
Lotsane River
Serorome River
Notwane River
Metsimotlhabe River
Marico River

Okavango Delta
Okavango River
Ngamaseri River
Khwai River
Eiseb River
Xaudum River

Makgadikgadi Pan
Boteti River (flows out of the Okavango Delta in rainy seasons)
Thamalakane River
Nata River
Tutume River
Semowane River
Mosetse River
Lepashe River
Mosope River

Kalahari Desert
Okwa River

References
United Nations 2004
GEOnet Names Server

Botswana
Rivers